Bengt Albin Gösta Dalqvist (born 28 March 1975), also known as Dahlqvist, is a Swedish actor, dancer and singer.

Career
He acted in over 500 episodes of the TV4 series Skilda världar, as the character Daniel Toivonen. He has also had a role in the musical West Side Story. Along with Eva Rydberg, he acted in the farce Arnbergs korsettfabrik at Intiman in 2001. He has also been a singer in the band The Odd Dogs. He auditioned for Idol 2009 on TV4, but was eliminated.

Personal life
Dalqvist is married to his wife, Nette Dalqvist (née Lövkvist). Together, they live in Södermalm, Stockholm and have two children.

Filmography

Film
Stigma (2000) – Mikael
Skönheten (2002) – The boy
Onyx (2003) – Niklas

Television
Sexton (1996) – Håkan
Skilda världar (1996–2002) – Daniel Toivonen
På rymmen (1999) – "Spårhund"
Nya lögner (1999) – Daniel Toivonen

References

External links

1975 births
21st-century Swedish male actors
Living people
Swedish male television actors
Swedish male musical theatre actors
Swedish male singers
People from Enköping